The 2015 Letran Knights men's basketball team represented Colegio de San Juan de Letran in the 91st season of the National Collegiate Athletic Association in the Philippines. The men's basketball tournament for the school year 2015-16 began on June 27, 2015, and the host school for the season was Mapúa Institute of Technology.

The Knights finished the double round-robin eliminations tied at first and second places together with the defending champions San Beda Red Lions with 13 wins against 5 losses. In the classification match, the Knights failed to clinched the top seed, but still got the twice-to-beat advantage going in to the Final Four. In the Final Four, the Knights beat the Mapúa Cardinals led by Nigerian center and newly-crowned Season 91 MVP Allwell Oraeme, 91–90, and went on to the Finals to face the defending champions San Beda.

The Knights then defeated the Red Lions in three games, with the final game reached in overtime, ending a ten-year title drought. Mark Cruz was named NCAA Finals MVP, averaging 17.3 points, 6.3 rebounds, 4.3 assists, and three steals.

Roster 

 Depth chart Depth chart

Coaching changes 
Letran officials hired Aldin Ayo as the new head coach for the Knights, replacing Caloy Garcia. Ayo, then a Sorsogon CIty councilor and head coach of the city's youth program, was the former point guard of the Letran Knights in 1998 & 1999.

Added to the sidelines were former PBA player and former head coach of FEU Tamaraws Glenn Capacio, former FEU assistant coach and Letran alumnus Louie Gonzalez, and Filipino boxing icon Manny Pacquiao as its team manager.

Roster changes 
The Knights lost two of its key players last season, Ford Ruaya and Jamil Gabawan, as they have used up their eligibility. Chester Saldua and Daryl Singontiko opted to transfer to University of Perpetual Help System DALTA, while Fidel Castro and John Tambeling also transferred to PCU.

Holdovers were Mark Cruz, Kevin Racal, Rey Nambatac, McJour Luib and Bong Quinto. Added to the roster were Jerrick Balanza and Tommy Gedaria from the Letran Squires program, and transferee Jom Sollano.

Suspensions 
The NCAA Management Committee slapped Letran head coach Aldin Ayo a one game suspension for throwing a monobloc chair in protest of a foul called on guard McJour Luib in the Knights’ 83-78 victory against Lyceum, which earned him a technical foul. Ayo already earned a warning when the Knights were playing against the San Sebastian Stags after he removed an eyeglass of his assistant and gave it to the referee.

NCAA Season 91 games results 

Elimination games were played in a double round-robin format. All games were aired on ABS-CBN Sports and Action.

Source: ABS-CBN Sports

Awards

References 

Letran Knights basketball team seasons